The 2018 Austrian motorcycle Grand Prix was the eleventh round of the 2018 MotoGP season. It was held at the Red Bull Ring in Spielberg on 12 August 2018. The victory would prove to be Lorenzo's last in MotoGP, as well as his final podium finish.

Classification

MotoGP

Moto2

 Xavi Vierge suffered a broken wrist in a collision with Steven Odendaal during qualifying and was declared unfit to start the race.

Moto3

Championship standings after the race

MotoGP

Moto2

Moto3

Notes

References

Austrian
Motorcycle Grand Prix
Austrian motorcycle Grand Prix
Austrian motorcycle Grand Prix